The New Constitutional Society for Women's Suffrage was a British organisation that campaigned for women to be given the vote. It was formed in January 1910 following the election to lobby Liberal members of parliament. The organisation was not militant and it did not support (or decry) the actions of suffragettes. Its objective was "... to unite all suffragists who believe in the anti-Government election policy, who desire to work by constitutional means, and to abstain from public criticism of other suffragists whose conscience leads them to adopt different methods".

Notable members

Helen Ogston an activist, known for her anger, was an employee in 1910. She had been a leading suffragette the year before. Kate Frye was an organiser in East Anglia. She became the secretary of this organisation in 1914 In 1916 they employed Mary Phillips who was another ex-WSPU member (amongst others).

Legacy
The organisation is thought to have ended when some British women were first given the vote in 1918. None of the organisation's papers have survived, but the diary of the organisation's secretary Kate Frye was discovered and the relevant sections have been edited and published.

References

1910 establishments in the United Kingdom
Feminist organisations in the United Kingdom
First-wave feminism
Organisations based in London
Organizations established in 1910
Women's organisations based in the United Kingdom
Social history of the United Kingdom
Suffrage organisations in the United Kingdom